Lance Angelo Lucido, better known as Lance Lucido (born February 27, 2007), is a Filipino child actor and dancer.

Career
Lance Lucido was born on February 27, 2007, in Iloilo City, Philippines. In 2010, Lucido left Iloilo for Manila with a new designation as the liaison of the Police Regional Office 6 SPO2 Flor Lucido In Camp Crame. His mother’s transfer gave Lance Angelo the opportunity to attend talent workshops at Mamus Talent House, and join auditions.  A year after their transfer to Taguig, Metro Manila, he had his first television appearance.

He has been a part of several TV shows, such as Alice Bungisngis and her Wonder Walis (GMA), Wansapanataym (ABS-CBN), Juan dela Cruz (ABS-CBN), Apoy Sa Dagat (ABS-CBN), and Kahit Konting Pagtingin (ABS-CBN); and now, is a regular cast in the ABS-CBN's children gag show, Goin' Bulilit. He also appeared in various TV Commercials, & Endorsers such as the Joy (powered with Safeguard), Mister Donut, Pizza Hut, Eden Cheese commercial, Red Ribbon, Cynos Inside Haircare, Sun Life Financial, Beryls Chocolate (Malaysia Only), Betadine Antiseptic, Cignal Digital TV, &, Boardwalk (Direct Selling Brand)

Filmography

Television

Movies

References

External links
 

Living people
Filipino television personalities
2007 births
Filipino male child actors
Star Magic
People from Taguig
People from Iloilo City
Male actors from Iloilo